Gravity Talks is the debut album by American rock band Green on Red, released in 1983.

Production
Gravity Talks was recorded at Quad Teck Studios in Los Angeles.

Critical reception
The Guardian written: "This is music made by high-school geeks who dream of being desperadoes. The result was a brilliant, misguided wreck, halfway to Tulsa when the wheels fell off." Trouser Press wrote that "at the LP’s relative weirdest, Chris Cacavas’ organ- playing sounds like several genres from the ’60s, but only mildly." The Washington Post thought that Green on Red "has fashioned a ragged, primitive musical attack to complement nerve-wracking original songs."

Track listing
All songs written by Dan Stuart, Chris Cacavas, Jack Waterson, and Alex MacNicol.
"Gravity Talks"
"Old Chief"
"5 Easy Pieces"
"Deliverance"
"Over My Head"
"Snake Bit"
"Alice"
"Blue Parade"
"That's What You're Here For"
"Brave Generation"
"Abigail's Ghost"
"Cheap Wine"
"Narcolepsy"

Personnel
Green on Red
Dan Stuart – vocals, guitar
Chris Cacavas – keyboards, guitar, lap steel, vocals
Jack Waterson – bass
Alex McNicol – drums, percussion

Additional personnel
Matthew Piucci – guitar
Steve Wynn – guitar, vocals

References

1983 debut albums
Green on Red albums
Slash Records albums